The 2016 Auckland Darts Masters, presented by TAB & Burger King was the second staging of the tournament by the Professional Darts Corporation, as a second entry in the 2016 World Series of Darts. The tournament featured 16 players (eight PDC players facing eight regional qualifiers) and was held at The Trusts Arena in Auckland, New Zealand between 17–19 June 2016.

Adrian Lewis was the defending champion after winning the first edition of the tournament by defeating Raymond van Barneveld 11–10 in the final.

Lewis could not successfully defend his title: Gary Anderson won the title after defeating Lewis 11–7 in the final.

Qualifiers
The eight PDC players (with the top 4 seeded) were: 
  Gary Anderson (winner)
  Michael van Gerwen (quarter-finals)
  Phil Taylor (quarter-finals)
  Dave Chisnall (quarter-finals)
  Adrian Lewis (runner-up)
  Peter Wright (quarter-finals)
  James Wade (semi-finals)
  Raymond van Barneveld (semi-finals)

The Oceanic qualifiers were:
  Warren Parry (first round)
  Cody Harris (first round)
  Damon Heta (first round)
  Rob Szabo (first round)
  Ken Moir (first round)
  Tic Bridge (first round)
  Bernie Smith (first round)
  Stuart Leach (first round)

Draw

References

Auckland Darts Masters
Auckland Darts Masters
World Series of Darts
Sport in Auckland
June 2016 sports events in New Zealand